Sainte-Opportune is a commune in the Orne department of north-western France.

See also
Communes of the Orne department

References

Sainteopportune